Acta Arithmetica is a scientific journal of mathematics publishing papers on number theory. It was established in 1935 by Salomon Lubelski and Arnold Walfisz. The journal is published by the Institute of Mathematics of the Polish Academy of Sciences.

References

External links 
 Online archives (Library of Science, Issues: 1935–2000)

1935 establishments in Poland
Mathematics journals
Publications established in 1935
Polish Academy of Sciences academic journals
Multilingual journals
Biweekly journals
Academic journals associated with learned and professional societies